Cnephasitis sapana is a species of moth of the family Tortricidae, described by Józef Razowski in 2008. It is found in northern Vietnam.

The wingspan is about 26 mm. The ground colour of the forewings is pale grey. The spots along the wing edges are dark grey. The markings are grey with black marks. The hindwings are greyish cream. The ground colour of the forewings of females is grey with darker suffusions, dots and strigulae (fine streaks). The markings are dark grey with a few darker dots.

Etymology
The name refers to the type locality.

References

Moths described in 2008
Polyorthini
Moths of Asia
Taxa named by Józef Razowski